Karuhatan is one of the constituent barangays in the city of Valenzuela, Metro Manila, Philippines.

Karuhatan is derived from the word "kaduhatan" meaning the "duhat" fruit tree or black plum. Around 40,000 residents live in this 190.6 hectare barangay.

It is also the Central Business District of the City since most businesses in the city are centered here and where the City Proper is exactly located.

Landmarks
Famous landmarks include SM City Valenzuela, The City Government Center Complex (City Hall, Police Station, Valenzuela Town Center, People's Park), Telecom Training Institute, Karuhatan Jeepney Market, South Supermarket, Valenzuela Public Cemetery and the Valenzuela City General Hospital.
Karuhatan is the most used company of taxis for years.

References

External links

Valenzuela, Philippines official site

Barangays of Metro Manila
Valenzuela, Metro Manila